Crystal Davis Peoples-Stokes (born December 22, 1951) is an American politician serving as Majority Leader of the New York State Assembly representing Assembly District 141, which includes the city of Buffalo within Erie County, New York.

Education
Peoples-Stokes attended Buffalo State College, where she earned her B.S. degree in elementary education and master's degree in student personnel administration.

Career 
She worked as a member of the Erie County Legislature representing the 7th District from 1993 to 2002.

In 2000, Peoples-Stokes, a member of Grassroots and the majority leader of the Erie County Legislature, ran against incumbent Assemblyman Arthur O. Eve. The race was described by The New York Times as the toughest election contest of Eve's political career.  Peoples-Stokes's Democratic primary election challenge was almost successful, and it was credited with energizing minority voters to elect Byron Brown as a New York State Senator.

Peoples-Stokes was elected to the State Assembly in November 2002, after Eve's retirement. She ran uncontested in the November 2008 and November 2010 general elections.

On December 17, 2018, Peoples-Stokes was appointed Majority Leader of the New York State Assembly, becoming the first woman and first African American to serve in the role.

In the 2020 Presidential Election, People-Stokes served as an alternate elector, replacing Lovely A. Warren.

Personal life 
Peoples-Stokes lives in Buffalo, New York, with her daughter Rashaun and grandson Kaleb Malik.

References

External links
New York State Assembly Member Website

|-

1951 births
20th-century African-American people
21st-century African-American women
21st-century African-American politicians
21st-century American politicians
21st-century American women politicians
African-American state legislators in New York (state)
African-American women in politics
Buffalo State College alumni
County legislators in New York (state)
Living people
Democratic Party members of the New York State Assembly
Politicians from Buffalo, New York
Women state legislators in New York (state)
20th-century African-American women